The women's shot put event at the 2008 Olympic Games took place on 16 August at the Beijing Olympic Stadium.

The event was won by Valerie Vili (née Adams) of New Zealand, with a best throw of 20.56 metres.

In 2016, it was announced that a reanalysis of samples resulted in a doping violation by Natallia Mikhnevich and Nadzeya Ostapchuk. They were disqualified from the competition.  Medals of other teams have been reallocated by IAAF.

Schedule
All times are China standard time (UTC+8)

Records
Prior to this competition, the existing world and Olympic records were as follows.

No new world or Olympic records were set for this event.

Results

Qualifying round
Qualification: Qualifying Performance 18.40 (Q) or at least 12 best performers (q) advance to the Final.

Final

References
 sports-reference

Athletics at the 2008 Summer Olympics
Shot put at the Olympics
2008 in women's athletics
Women's events at the 2008 Summer Olympics